El-Baz (also spelled Elbaz, Al-Baz, Albaz or ElBez is an Arabic surname, meaning "the falcon" ("Baz" means falcon in Arabic). It could possibly be linked to the city of Elvas (Portugal), the Spanish surname Paz and the Jewish square El Bayazin ("The Falconers") in Granada. El-Baz is a large prestigious family that mostly consists of royals, scientists, and scholars. As it is also known to be an extremely wealthy family throughout history.

Notable people 
 Abdul Aziz bin Abdullah bin Baz (1910–1999), Saudi Arabian Salafi or Wahhabi Islamic scholar
 Farouk El-Baz (born 1938), Egyptian-American scientist
 Osama El-Baz (born 1931), Egyptian diplomat
 Rania al-Baz, Saudi Arabian television presenter and domestic abuse victim

Elbaz 
 Alber Elbaz (1961–2021, Casablanca, Morocco), Moroccan-Israeli fashion designer
 André Elbaz (born 1934, El Jadida, Morocco), Jewish Moroccan painter and filmmaker
Cheb i Sabbah (1947–2013) born Haim Serge El-Baz, Jewish Algerian club DJ
David Elbaz (born 1966, Paris, France) French astrophysicist and author
Gad Elbaz (born 1982), Israeli haredi singer
 Nathan Elbaz (1932–1954), Israel Defense Forces soldier
 Stéphanie Elbaz, French pianist
 Vincent Elbaz (born 1971, Paris), Jewish French actor

See also 
 Baz (disambiguation)
 Albats

Arabic-language surnames
Arab-Jewish surnames
Maghrebi Jewish surnames
Surnames of Moroccan origin